Solo is a 1996 science fiction action film directed by Norberto Barba, and starring Mario Van Peebles, William Sadler, Adrien Brody, Barry Corbin and Demián Bichir. The film was based on the 1989 novel Weapon by Robert Mason, and was adapted into a screenplay by David L. Corley for Columbia/TriStar Pictures.

Plot
Solo is an android designed as a military killing machine. He is sent to Central America by General Haynes to battle guerrilla insurgents, but a flaw develops in his programming and he develops a conscience and compassion. His developers try to take him back for deprogramming, but he flees to the jungle in a helicopter. His main energy supply was damaged during the first mission, forcing him to switch to his much less powerful secondary power. He joins a small village community that is under constant threat from guerilla attackers, and he protects them in exchange for use of their electric generator (they previously used it to power a television). There he learns to 'bluff' from a child that befriends him, Miguel.

Solo helps the villagers drive off local Warlord Rio and his small army, but the combat is detected by a military satellite. A black ops team is sent to recover or destroy Solo, while they ally with Rio. The highly sadistic black ops leader, Colonel Frank Madden, who has an intense hatred for Solo as he sees Solo renders the Black Ops members like him out of job, brings in Dr. Bill Stewart, Solo's creator, as a lure, leaving the man mortally wounded but Solo survives. Having occupied the village, the militiamen and black ops team attempt to kill Solo, but he manages to kill them.

Rio is betrayed by Madden, who tries to kill Solo with an automatic grenade launcher. Solo is able to fight Madden in hand-to-hand combat and non-fatally break his spine. Suddenly a helicopter delivers a more powerful version of the android, which is armed with a multi-barreled gun and has Madden's face. The MkII kills Madden and proceeds to hunt down Solo. Solo rescues the villagers and destroys the MkII android, using his acquired bluffing skills. After the temple the two androids fought in collapses, causing the military to pull out believing both units are destroyed and unrecoverable, Miguel mourns Solo believing he was destroyed by cave-in, but Miguel starts to hear Solo, laughing, as he knows he has earned his freedom.

Cast

Production
At one point, producer Lawrence Gordon had initially purchased the rights to Weapon along with options on other books penned by Robert Mason. 

Following his work directing Panther, Mario Van Peebles was looking for a project that would provide him a complex character to play and felt Solo with its depictions of indigenous people under the threat of superior technology provided opportunity to do so. The film was shot entirely in Puerto Vallarta.

Reception

Critical response
The film has an 8% rating on review aggregate Rotten Tomatoes, based on 36 reviews, with the consensus stating: "Featuring hammy performances and bland characters, Solo is an all too straightforward actioner that's both predictable and instantly forgettable."

References

External links

1996 films
Android (robot) films
American science fiction action films
Triumph Films films
Films based on science fiction novels
Films based on American novels
1990s science fiction action films
Films scored by Christopher Franke
1990s English-language films
1990s American films